Patrice "The Dark Ronin" Quarteron (born in Sevran on 20 March 1979) is a French heavyweight kickboxer, fighting out of Évry, Essonne. He is two time French and European Muay Thai champion and current IKF Muay Thai Super Heavyweight World champion.

Biography and career
Quarteron faced Frédéric Sinistra for the second time on November 17, 2012 in Liège, Belgium and the pair fought to a draw.

He beat Andrei Gerasimchuk and Dmitry Bezus to win the four man heavyweight tournament at the Thai Fight 2012 67kg & 70kg Tournament Finals in Bangkok, Thailand on December 16, 2012.

Quarteron was expected to fight Badr Hari at Global FC 4 in Dubai, UAE on October 16, 2014., but he was mysteriously replaced by another fighter, just 48 hours before the event.

He defeated Dževad Poturak in Carpentier Hall in Paris, France, on December 10, 2015, knocking him out in the first round with elbows.
Patrice Quarteron hasn't been beaten since 2009.

Quarteron defeated Rick Cheek by TKO at 2:00 of round 1 on June 20, 2008 in Montego Bay, Jamaica to win the IKF Pro Full Muay Thai Rules Super Heavyweight World title.

On 14 of december 2017 Patrice Quarteron plan to fight Sean Tolouee in Paris

Titles
 2012 Thai Fight Heavyweight Tournament champion
 2008 IKF Muay Thai Super Heavyweight World champion
 2007 A1 World champion
 2006 World Kickboxing Network (W.K.N.) Kickboxing European GP champion
 2006 French Kickboxing vice champion
 2006 French champion Honor of  French Boxing
 2005 Thaiboxing Carabeen Tournament champion
 2005 Belgium Kickboxing champion
 2005 K-1 Hungary Grand Prix runner up
 2004 EMF/WMF European Heavyweight Thaiboxing champion

Kickboxing record

|-
|-  bgcolor="#CCFFCC"
| 2019-03-21|| Win ||align=left|Diego Dos Santos || Quarteron vs Dos Santos|| France || TKO(Referee Stoppage/4 Kockowns) || 2 ||
|-
|-  bgcolor="#CCFFCC"
| 2017-03-23 || Win ||align=left| James Wilson || Paris Fight 3|| Paris, France || DQ (punches on the ground) || 1 || 
|- 
|-  bgcolor="#FFBBBB"
| 2016-11-24 || Loss ||align=left| Daniel Sam || Paris Fight 2 || Paris, France || Decision || 3 || 3:00
|- 
|-  bgcolor="#CCFFCC"
| 2015-12-10 || Win ||align=left| Dževad Poturak || Paris Fight  || Paris, France  || KO (Elbows) ||1 ||0:20 
|-
|-  bgcolor="#CCFFCC"
| 2014-12-25 || Win ||align=left| Zamig Athakishiyev || One Shot World Series  || Antalya, Turkey  || Decision (Unanimous) ||3 ||3:00 
|-
|-  bgcolor="#CCFFCC"
| 2014-06-27||Win||align=left| Kolstenitch || Strike fight || Lyon, France ||KO||2||
|-
|-  bgcolor="#CCFFCC"
| 2013-06-15 ||Win ||align=left| Luca Panto || Ultimate Kickboxing 3 || Evry, France ||KO ||3 ||
|-
|-  bgcolor="#CCFFCC"
| 2013-05-31 ||Win ||align=left| Cihat Kapenek || A-1 World Combat Cup || Istanbul, Turkey ||Decision (Unanimous) ||3 ||3:00 
|-
|-  bgcolor="#CCFFCC"
| 2012-12-16 ||Win ||align=left| Dmitry Bezus || Thai Fight 2012 Heavyweight Tournament, Final || Bangkok, Thailand || Decision|| 3||3:00
|-
! style=background:white colspan=9 |
|-
|-  bgcolor="#CCFFCC"
| 2012-12-16 ||Win ||align=left| Andrei Gerasimchuk || Thai Fight 2012 Heavyweight Tournament, Semi Finals || Bangkok, Thailand || || ||
|-
|-  bgcolor="#c5d2ea"
| 2012-11-17 || Draw ||align=left| Frédéric Sinistra || La Nuit Du Kick Boxing || Liège, Belgium || Decision Draw || ||
|-
|-  bgcolor="#CCFFCC"
| 2012-03-24 || Win ||align=left| Frédéric Sinistra || Ultimate Kick-Boxing 2 || Évry, France || KO (elbows) || 1 ||
|-
|-  bgcolor="#CCFFCC"
| 2011-02-12 || Win ||align=left| Radu Spinghel || Ultimate Kick Boxing || Thiais, France || KO || 1 || 
|-
|-  bgcolor="#CCFFCC"
| 2009-11-28 || Win ||align=left| Bob Sapp || A-1 World Combat Cup || Lyon, France || KO (Knee) || 1 || 2:32
|-
|-  bgcolor="#CCFFCC"
| 2009-11-11 || Win ||align=left| Andre Meunier || Last Man Standing || Melbourne, Australia || KO (elbows) || 2 || 
|-
|-  bgcolor="#FFBBBB"
| 2009-06-26 || Loss ||align=left| Paul Slowinski || Champions of Champions II || Montego Bay, Jamaica || KO (Left hook) || 2 || 1:55
|-
! style=background:white colspan=9 |
|-
|-  bgcolor="#CCFFCC"
| 2009-04-18 || Win ||align=left| Vasile Popovici || Fight Zone III || Villeurbanne, France || KO || 1 || 
|-
|-  bgcolor="#CCFFCC"
| 2008-06-20 || Win ||align=left| Rick Cheek || International Muaythai Fight Night || Montego Bay, Jamaica || KO (Low kicks) || 1 || 2:00
|-
! style=background:white colspan=9 |
|-
|-  bgcolor="#CCFFCC"
| 2008-06-13 || Win ||align=left| Humberto Evora || Carcharias Fighting Championship || Perpignan, France || TKO (Corner stoppage) || 1 || 0:30
|-
|-  bgcolor="#CCFFCC"
| 2008-04-26 || Win ||align=left| Daniel Marhold || Fight Zone II || Villeurbanne, France || TKO (Low kicks) || 1 || 2:00
|-
|-  bgcolor="#CCFFCC"
| 2008-03-31 || Win ||align=left| Chris Christoupoulides || No Respect 4 || Melbourne, Australia || TKO (Referee stoppage) || 1 || 
|-
|-  bgcolor="#CCFFCC"
| 2007-12-21 || Win ||align=left| Sergei Arkhipov || A-1 World Combat Cup || Turkey || TKO (Corner stoppage) || 4 || 
|-
|-  bgcolor="#CCFFCC"
| 2007-10-12 || Win ||align=left| Fabrice Aurieng || A-1 World Combat Cup || Ankara, Turkey || KO (Knee strike) || 1 || 
|-
|-  bgcolor="#CCFFCC"
| 2007-07-20 || Win ||align=left| Orhan Dogan || A-1 World Combat Cup || Istanbul, Turkey || KO (Low kicks) || 2 || 
|-
|-  bgcolor="#CCFFCC"
| 2007-07-14 || Win ||align=left| Marcin Rozalski || A-1 World Combat Cup || Turkey || TKO || 3 || 
|-
|-  bgcolor="#CCFFCC"
| 2007-06-16 || Win ||align=left| Nash Urladzic || La Nuit des Superfights VIII || Paris-Bercy, France || TKO (Referee stoppage) || 1 || 
|-
|-  bgcolor="#CCFFCC"
| 2007-05-29 || Win ||align=left| Jordan Faribol || Fight Zone I || Villeurbanne, France || TKO (Corner stoppage) || 1 || 
|-
|-  bgcolor="#CCFFCC"
| 2007-05-04 || Win ||align=left| Ashwin Balrak || K-1 Fighting Network Romania 2007, Reserve fight || Bucharest, Romania || Decision (Unanimous) || 3 || 3:00
|-
|-  bgcolor="#CCFFCC"
| 2007-02-10 || Win ||align=left| Alix Kehil || La Nuit des Superfights VI || Villeurbanne, France || KO || 1 || 
|-
|-  bgcolor="#CCFFCC"
| 2007-01-26 || Win ||align=left| Sergei Gur || K-1 Rules Kick Tournament 2007 in Marseilles || Marseille, France || TKO || 3 || 
|-
|-  bgcolor="#CCFFCC"
| 2006-12-16 || Win ||align=left| Brice Guidon || La Nuit des Superfights V || Villebon, France || TKO (Referee stoppage) || 1 || 
|-
|-  bgcolor="#FFBBBB"
| 2006-05-20 || Loss ||align=left| Guy N'Guessan || WAKO World title || France || TKO (Eye injury) ||  || 
|-
! style=background:white colspan=9 |
|-
|-  bgcolor="#CCFFCC"
| 2006-03-10 || Win ||align=left| Alban Galonnier || WKN European GP 2006, Final || Perpignan, France || TKO || 2 || 
|-
! style=background:white colspan=9 |
|-
|-  bgcolor="#CCFFCC"
| 2006-03-10 || Win ||align=left| Aurel Bococi || WKN European GP 2006, Semi Final || Perpignan, France || TKO (Knee injury) || 2 || 
|-
|-  bgcolor="#FFBBBB"
| 2005-11-26 || Loss ||align=left| Gregory Tony || La Nuit des Champions || Marseilles, France || Decision (Unanimous) || 5 || 2:00
|-
! style=background:white colspan=9 |
|-
|-  bgcolor="#FFBBBB"
| 2005-08-19 || Loss ||align=left| Attila Karacs || K-1 Hungary Grand Prix 2005, Final || Debrecen, Hungary || KO (Punch) || 1 || 2:45
|-
! style=background:white colspan=9 |
|-
|-  bgcolor="#CCFFCC"
| 2005-08-19 || Win ||align=left| Sandor Kiss || K-1 Hungary Grand Prix 2005, Semi Final || Debrecen, Hungary || TKO || 1 || 
|-
|-  bgcolor="#CCFFCC"
| 2005-06-04 || Win ||align=left| Mamadou Camara || Thaiboxing Carabeen Tournament, Final || Saint-Ouen, France || KO || 1 || 0:50
|-
! style=background:white colspan=9 |
|-
|-  bgcolor="#CCFFCC"
| 2005-06-04 || Win ||align=left| Sylvain Verne || Thaiboxing Carabeen Tournament, Semi Final || Saint-Ouen, France || KO || 1 || 
|-
|-  bgcolor="#CCFFCC"
| 2005-05-28 || Win ||align=left| Diego Massimongo || "New Talents" || Mouscron, Belgium || KO (Low kicks) || 1 || 0:30
|-
|-  bgcolor="#FFBBBB"
| 2004-12-03 || Loss ||align=left| Humberto Evora || WAKO-PRO Gala of the Champs || Lisbon, Portugal || KO || 1 || 
|-
|-  bgcolor="#CCFFCC"
| 2004-10-24 || Win ||align=left|  || WMF European Muay Thai Amateur Championship, Final || Prague, Czech Republic || KO || 1 || 1:30
|-
! style=background:white colspan=9 |
|-
|-  bgcolor="#CCFFCC"
| 2004-10-24 || Win ||align=left| Joze Strep || WMF European Muay Thai Amateur Championship, Semi Final || Prague, Czech Republic || KO || 1 || 
|-
|-
| colspan=9 | Legend:

See also
List of K-1 events
List of male kickboxers

References

1979 births
Living people
French male kickboxers
Heavyweight kickboxers
French Muay Thai practitioners
French savateurs
Sportspeople from Seine-Saint-Denis